The 1912 South East Essex by-election was held on 16 March 1912.  The by-election was held due to the resignation of the incumbent Conservative MP, John Hendley Morrison Kirkwood.  It was won by the Conservative candidate Rupert Guinness, who was unopposed.  Guinness had previously been MP for Haggerston.

References

1912 in England
1912 elections in the United Kingdom
By-elections to the Parliament of the United Kingdom in Essex constituencies
Unopposed by-elections to the Parliament of the United Kingdom (need citation)
1910s in Essex